The Aruba leaf-toed gecko (Phyllodactylus julieni) is a species of gecko. It is endemic to Aruba.

References

Phyllodactylus
Reptiles described in 1885